Modern Method Records was a record label that helped to document the Boston hardcore scene in the early 1980s. Modern Method was an offshoot of the Newbury Comics music retailer and also the Boston Rock magazine. The label was located at 268 Newbury ST. in Boston, Massachusetts.

Discography 

Record labels established in 1980
American independent record labels
Culture of Boston